Turriff Castle was a tower house, on Castlegate, Turriff, north of Idoch Water, Aberdeenshire, Scotland.
The castle was also called Tower of Torrey of Castle Rainy.

History
The castle, which stood in an area bounded by Castlehill, Mill Road, Gall Street and Deveron Street still existed in the early 17th century, while remains survived until the 19th century.

Structure
Turriff Castle had a vaulted basement.

See also
Castles in Great Britain and Ireland
List of castles in Scotland

References

Castles in Aberdeenshire